|}

This is a list of electoral division results for the Australian 1954 federal election.

New South Wales

Banks 
This section is an excerpt from Electoral results for the Division of Banks § 1954

Barton 
This section is an excerpt from Electoral results for the Division of Barton § 1954

Bennelong 
This section is an excerpt from Electoral results for the Division of Bennelong § 1954

Blaxland 
This section is an excerpt from Electoral results for the Division of Blaxland § 1954

Bradfield 
This section is an excerpt from Electoral results for the Division of Bradfield § 1954

Calare 
This section is an excerpt from Electoral results for the Division of Calare § 1954

Cook 
This section is an excerpt from Electoral results for the Division of Cook (1906–1955) § 1954

Cunningham 
This section is an excerpt from Electoral results for the Division of Cunningham § 1954

Cowper 
This section is an excerpt from Electoral results for the Division of Cowper § 1954

Dalley 
This section is an excerpt from Electoral results for the Division of Dalley § 1954

Darling 
This section is an excerpt from Electoral results for the Division of Darling § 1954

East Sydney 
This section is an excerpt from Electoral results for the Division of East Sydney § 1954

Eden-Monaro 
This section is an excerpt from Electoral results for the Division of Eden-Monaro § 1954

Evans 
This section is an excerpt from Electoral results for the Division of Evans § 1954

Farrer 
This section is an excerpt from Electoral results for the Division of Farrer § 1954

Grayndler 
This section is an excerpt from Electoral results for the Division of Grayndler § 1954

Gwydir 
This section is an excerpt from Electoral results for the Division of Gwydir § 1954

Hume 
This section is an excerpt from Electoral results for the Division of Hume § 1954

Hunter 
This section is an excerpt from Electoral results for the Division of Hunter § 1954

Kingsford Smith 
This section is an excerpt from Electoral results for the Division of Kingsford Smith § 1954

Lang 
This section is an excerpt from Electoral results for the Division of Lang § 1954

Lawson 
This section is an excerpt from Electoral results for the Division of Lawson § 1954

Lowe 
This section is an excerpt from Electoral results for the Division of Lowe § 1954

Lyne 
This section is an excerpt from Electoral results for the Division of Lyne § 1954

Macarthur 
This section is an excerpt from Electoral results for the Division of Macarthur § 1954

Mackellar 
This section is an excerpt from Electoral results for the Division of Mackellar § 1954

Macquarie 
This section is an excerpt from Electoral results for the Division of Macquarie § 1954

Martin 
This section is an excerpt from Electoral results for the Division of Martin § 1954

Mitchell 
This section is an excerpt from Electoral results for the Division of Mitchell § 1954

New England 
This section is an excerpt from Electoral results for the Division of New England § 1954

Newcastle 
This section is an excerpt from Electoral results for the Division of Newcastle1954

North Sydney 
This section is an excerpt from Electoral results for the Division of North Sydney § 1954

Parkes 
This section is an excerpt from Electoral results for the Division of Parkes (1901–1969) § 1954

Parramatta 
This section is an excerpt from Electoral results for the Division of Parramatta § 1954

Paterson 
This section is an excerpt from Electoral results for the Division of Paterson § 1954

Phillip 
This section is an excerpt from Electoral results for the Division of Phillip § 1954

Reid
This section is an excerpt from Electoral results for the Division of Reid § 1954

Richmond 
This section is an excerpt from Electoral results for the Division of Richmond § 1954

Riverina 
This section is an excerpt from Electoral results for the Division of Riverina § 1954

Robertson 
This section is an excerpt from Electoral results for the Division of Robertson § 1954

Shortland 
This section is an excerpt from Electoral results for the Division of Shortland § 1954

St George 
This section is an excerpt from Electoral results for the Division of St George § 1954

Warringah 
This section is an excerpt from Electoral results for the Division of Warringah § 1954

Watson 
This section is an excerpt from Electoral results for the Division of Watson (1934–1969) § 1954

Wentworth 
This section is an excerpt from Electoral results for the Division of Wentworth § 1954

Werriwa 
This section is an excerpt from Electoral results for the Division of Werriwa § 1954

West Sydney 
This section is an excerpt from Electoral results for the Division of West Sydney § 1954

Victoria

Balaclava 
This section is an excerpt from Electoral results for the Division of Balaclava § 1954

Ballaarat 
This section is an excerpt from Electoral results for the Division of Ballarat § 1954

Batman 
This section is an excerpt from Electoral results for the Division of Batman § 1954

Bendigo 
This section is an excerpt from Electoral results for the Division of Bendigo § 1954

Burke 
This section is an excerpt from Electoral results for the Division of Burke (1949–1955) § 1954

Chisholm 
This section is an excerpt from Electoral results for the Division of Chisholm § 1954

Corangamite 
This section is an excerpt from Electoral results for the Division of Corangamite § 1954

Corio 
This section is an excerpt from Electoral results for the Division of Corio § 1954

Darebin 
This section is an excerpt from Electoral results for the Division of Darebin § 1954

Deakin 
This section is an excerpt from Electoral results for the Division of Deakin § 1954

Fawkner 
This section is an excerpt from Electoral results for the Division of Fawkner § 1954

Flinders 
This section is an excerpt from Electoral results for the Division of Flinders § 1954

Gellibrand 
This section is an excerpt from Electoral results for the Division of Gellibrand § 1954

Gippsland 
This section is an excerpt from Electoral results for the Division of Gippsland § 1954

Henty 
This section is an excerpt from Electoral results for the Division of Henty § 1954

Higgins 
This section is an excerpt from Electoral results for the Division of Higgins § 1954

Higinbotham 
This section is an excerpt from Electoral results for the Division of Higinbotham § 1954

Hoddle 
This section is an excerpt from Electoral results for the Division of Hoddle § 1954

Indi 
This section is an excerpt from Electoral results for the Division of Indi § 1954

Isaacs 
This section is an excerpt from Electoral results for the Division of Isaacs (1949–1969) § 1954

Kooyong 
This section is an excerpt from Electoral results for the Division of Kooyong § 1954

La Trobe 
This section is an excerpt from Electoral results for the Division of La Trobe § 1954

Lalor 
This section is an excerpt from Electoral results for the Division of Lalor § 1954

Mallee 
This section is an excerpt from Electoral results for the Division of Mallee § 1954

Maribyrnong 
This section is an excerpt from Electoral results for the Division of Maribyrnong § 1954

McMillan 
This section is an excerpt from Electoral results for the Division of McMillan § 1954

Melbourne 
This section is an excerpt from Electoral results for the Division of Melbourne § 1954

Melbourne Ports 
This section is an excerpt from Electoral results for the Division of Melbourne Ports § 1954

Murray 
This section is an excerpt from Electoral results for the Division of Murray § 1954

Wannon 
This section is an excerpt from Electoral results for the Division of Wannon § 1954

Wills 
This section is an excerpt from Electoral results for the Division of Wills § 1954

Wimmera 
This section is an excerpt from Electoral results for the Division of Wimmera § 1954

Yarra 
This section is an excerpt from Electoral results for the Division of Yarra § 1954

Queensland

Bowman 
This section is an excerpt from Electoral results for the Division of Bowman § 1954

Brisbane 
This section is an excerpt from Electoral results for the Division of Brisbane § 1954

Capricornia 
This section is an excerpt from Electoral results for the Division of Capricornia § 1954

Darling Downs 
This section is an excerpt from Electoral results for the Division of Darling Downs § 1954

Dawson 
This section is an excerpt from Electoral results for the Division of Dawson § 1954

Fisher 
This section is an excerpt from Electoral results for the Division of Fisher § 1954

Griffith 
This section is an excerpt from Electoral results for the Division of Griffith § 1954

Herbert 
This section is an excerpt from Electoral results for the Division of Herbert § 1954

Kennedy 
This section is an excerpt from Electoral results for the Division of Kennedy § 1954

Leichhardt 
This section is an excerpt from Electoral results for the Division of Leichhardt § 1954

Lilley 
This section is an excerpt from Electoral results for the Division of Lilley § 1954

Maranoa 
This section is an excerpt from Electoral results for the Division of Maranoa § 1954

McPherson 
This section is an excerpt from Electoral results for the Division of McPherson § 1954

Moreton 
This section is an excerpt from Electoral results for the Division of Moreton § 1954

Oxley 
This section is an excerpt from Electoral results for the Division of Oxley § 1954

Petrie 
This section is an excerpt from Electoral results for the Division of Petrie § 1954

Ryan 
This section is an excerpt from Electoral results for the Division of Ryan § 1954

Wide Bay 
This section is an excerpt from Electoral results for the Division of Wide Bay § 1954

South Australia

Adelaide 
This section is an excerpt from Electoral results for the Division of Adelaide § 1954

Angas 
This section is an excerpt from Electoral results for the Division of Angas (1949–1977) § 1949

Barker 
This section is an excerpt from Electoral results for the Division of Barker § 1954

Boothby 
This section is an excerpt from Electoral results for the Division of Boothby § 1954

Grey 
This section is an excerpt from Electoral results for the Division of Grey § 1954

Hindmarsh 
This section is an excerpt from Electoral results for the Division of Hindmarsh § 1954

Kingston 
This section is an excerpt from Electoral results for the Division of Kingston § 1954

Port Adelaide 
This section is an excerpt from Electoral results for the Division of Port Adelaide § 1954

Sturt 
This section is an excerpt from Electoral results for the Division of Sturt § 1954

Wakefield 
This section is an excerpt from Electoral results for the Division of Wakefield § 1954

Western Australia

Canning 
This section is an excerpt from Electoral results for the Division of Canning § 1954

Curtin 
This section is an excerpt from Electoral results for the Division of Curtin § 1954

Forrest 
This section is an excerpt from Electoral results for the Division of Forrest § 1954

Fremantle 
This section is an excerpt from Electoral results for the Division of Fremantle § 1954

Kalgoorlie 
This section is an excerpt from Electoral results for the Division of Kalgoorlie § 1954

Moore 
This section is an excerpt from Electoral results for the Division of Moore § 1954

Perth 
This section is an excerpt from Electoral results for the Division of Perth § 1954

Swan 
This section is an excerpt from Electoral results for the Division of Swan § 1954

Tasmania

Bass 
This section is an excerpt from Electoral results for the Division of Bass § 1954

Darwin 
This section is an excerpt from Electoral results for the Division of Darwin § 1954

Denison 
This section is an excerpt from Electoral results for the Division of Denison § 1954

Franklin 
This section is an excerpt from Electoral results for the Division of Franklin § 1954

Wilmot 
This section is an excerpt from Electoral results for the Division of Wilmot § 1954

Territories

Australian Capital Territory 
This section is an excerpt from Electoral results for the Division of Australian Capital Territory § 1954

Northern Territory 
This section is an excerpt from Electoral results for the Division of Northern Territory § 1954

See also 

 Candidates of the 1954 Australian federal election
 Members of the Australian House of Representatives, 1954–1955

References 

House of Representatives 1954